Varshavskoye Highway (literally Warsaw Highway) is a major street in Moscow, Russia, continued beyond the city limit at Moscow Ring Road into Moscow Oblast as a backup route for M2 highway, a major trunk road. It continues the Bolshaya Tulskaya Street of central Moscow, and close from its start the Kashira Highway branches from it.

Roads in Moscow
Streets in Moscow